Rama Chandra Khuntia, usually known as     R. C. Khuntia, is an Indian politician. he was a Member of the Rajya Sabha from Odisha from 1998 to 2004 and 2008 to 2014.He serves as the General Secretary of Indian National Congress in charge of Telangana. & the current chairman of International Migrant Workers Working Group of the Geneva based. BWWI. He has many times represented in UN , ILO, MFA, BWI & Solidarity Centrs meetings on action plan for migrant workers. He has also organised Asian Migrant workers in India, Germany, UK & Brussels.

He was elected as the vice-president of IFBWW from 1999 to 2000 as well as the President of the Asia-Pacific Regional Committee of IFBWW. He was a member of the International Executive Board of IFFBW (elected in the World Congress of IFBWW in  Zimbabwe). He was a member of the ILO- WHO Joint Committee on Occupational Health. He is the titular member of the IFFBW Asia-Pacific Regional Committee since 1993. He was a delegate in the Closing Ceremony of Global March against Child Labour held in Geneva on 30 May 1998.

References

Living people
1953 births
Indian National Congress politicians from Odisha
Rajya Sabha members from Odisha
Utkal University alumni